Radka Bártová (born 16 July 1990) is a Slovak former competitive figure skater. She is the 2006 Karl Schäfer Memorial bronze medalist and 2007 Slovak national champion. She competed in the final segment at three ISU Championships – the 2005 World Junior Championships in Kitchener, Ontario, Canada; 2006 World Junior Championships in Ljubljana, Slovenia; and 2007 European Championships in Warsaw, Poland.

Bártová trained in Košice, Prešov, and Trebišov, coached by Hana Tőcziková and Miriam Lipčáková.

Programs

Competitive highlights

References

External links

 

1990 births
Slovak female single skaters
Living people
Sportspeople from Košice